Joel Onwonga (or Joel Onwong'a) is a Kenyan long distance runner, best known for winning the 1996 Twin Cities Marathon in 2:13:13.

Running career
Onwonga start running competitively at age 20. One of his first big races was the California International Marathon, where he placed 3rd. From there, Onwonga went around the country to compete in other races.

Onwonga competed in the Twin Cities Marathon three times. In 1995, he was favored to win. During the race, there were reports that he was tripped by another runner, which dropped him from the lead. He finished third as Rafael Zepeda took first place.  In 1996, Onwonga placed first in the Twin Cities Marathon, crossing the line in 2:13:13. Also in 1996, Onwonga won the Broad Street Run, a 10-mile run in Philadelphia, where he lived at the time.

After 1996, Onwonga ran a handful of other marathons; Stockholm Marathon, Houston Marathon, and Columbus Marathon. He placed at least in the top six for the rest of his career, but never won another marathon.

Early and personal life
Onwonga was born in Kenya. Following in his father's footsteps, he started running at a young age. He attended the Kenya College of Communications and Technology. After college, he moved to Pennsylvania, living in both Norristown and Philadelphia. He was married in 1996.

Achievements

in article, last name is spelled Onwoniga

See also
Twin Cities Marathon
Houston Marathon
Stockholm Marathon
California International Marathon

References 

Living people
Kenyan male long-distance runners
Kenyan male marathon runners
Year of birth missing (living people)